Inside the NBA, branded for sponsorship purposes as Inside the NBA presented by Kia, is the postgame show for NBA on TNT broadcasts. The program features host Ernie Johnson with analysts Kenny Smith, Charles Barkley, and  Shaquille O'Neal, with various supporting and fill-in analysts.

History

Inside the NBA debuted after TNT acquired the rights to broadcast NBA games during the 1989–90 season. In its first season, there were no permanent hosts or analysts. Craig Sager, Hannah Storm, Vince Cellini, Tim Brando and Fred Hickman shared hosting duties at various points of the season. In the following season, Ernie Johnson Jr., formerly a sideline reporter, took over as the show's full-time host, a role he retains to this day.

Initially, Inside the NBA focused on recaps of the day's games. Occasionally, Johnson invited a former or current NBA player or coach to sit in as a guest analyst. Kenny Smith joined Johnson full-time in 1998.

Newly-retired former NBA All-Star Charles Barkley joined TNT in 2000 and became notorious for his bold, and at times controversial, statements on the air.

In late 2002, Barkley told Kenny Smith that he would "kiss [his] ass" if Houston Rockets then-rookie Yao Ming scored 19 points in a game, which was followed by Yao doing exactly that later that week. As a result, on Listen Up! With Charles Barkley and Ernie Johnson that Thursday, Barkley kissed the rear end of a donkey that Smith brought into the studio. In 2002, a controversial Sports Illustrated cover, in which Barkley was portrayed in chains (as a slave), which led to a debate between Smith and Barkley about the merits of the cover.

During the 2000s, TNT added a third analyst alongside Smith and Barkley. Hall of Famer Magic Johnson served as the third analyst between 2003 and 2007, and Reggie Miller and Chris Webber split the role between 2008 and 2011.

Before the 2011–12 season, TNT hired Shaquille O'Neal as a studio analyst. O'Neal's addition led Inside the NBA to add the Shaqtin' a Fool segment, featuring bloopers from around the league.

In 2022, Green was added to TNT's analyst roster, and would contribute occasionally on the show while still an active player.

The popularity of the program has led the NBA to air reruns of the show (as well as reruns of other TNT NBA studio programs, NBA Tip-Off, the American Express Halftime Report and Game Break) on the TNT Overtime on NBA.com. Analysts from the show, with the notable exception of Barkley, have been featured in the popular NBA 2K video game series beginning with NBA 2K15. Beginning in 2011, the team has also covered the NCAA men's basketball tournament as CBS began partnering with Turner for NCAA March Madness.

During the 2021–22 season, Inside the NBA airs after TNT Tuesday games during the NFL regular season and on Thursday nights once football season ends. TNT moved its marquee games to Tuesday in the autumn and early in the winter in order to avoid competition with Thursday Night Football. The postgame shows after TNT Tuesday games, beginning in January, were rebranded as the NBA on TNT Postgame Show, with Adam Lefkoe as host and analysts O'Neal, Candace Parker and Dwyane Wade.

Wade decided not to return to NBA on TNT coverage for the 2022–23 season, choosing to focus on other business interests. Jamal Crawford replaced Wade as an analyst on NBA on TNT Tuesdays.

Prior to the 2022–23 season, Warner Bros. Discovery Sports announced contract renewals for all four of the main Inside the NBA panelists, including a 10-year extension for Barkley that he called "a life-altering deal".

Recurring segments
 

"Shaqtin' a Fool" is a blooper segment started by O'Neal when he joined the show in 2012 that has become popular since. Frequent nominees include JaVale McGee, Kendrick Perkins, Nick Young, Otto Porter, and Brandon Knight although even All-Stars like LeBron James, Blake Griffin, James Harden and Russell Westbrook have been featured.

"Area 21" is a segment hosted by Kevin Garnett, who joined the show following his retirement before the 2016–17 season. Noted for being more informal and by the presence of a "cuss button" for when Garnett or a guest wants to swear, which has sometimes been left unused.

"EJ's Neat-O Stat of the Night" is the traditional ending segment, sometimes noted for its lack of continued sponsorship ("Presented by NO ONE - Unsullied by sponsorship since 1989"), although Dave & Buster's, Taco Bell, Jim Beam, JBL, and EA Sports have sponsored it. It can sometimes feature interesting or humorous stats, but the segment is sometimes used for a comedy sketch.

"Who He Play For?" is a start-of-season customary game where Barkley is challenged to name the new teams of a number of NBA journeymen.

"Audio Toons" are old conversations and past events, animated by Cartoon Network.

"Players Only" was the name given to the Monday edition between 2017 and 2019, reserved for players-turned-analysts such as Webber, O'Neal, Garnett, Isiah Thomas, Chris Bosh and Baron Davis. WNBA players such as Lisa Leslie and Candace Parker would sit in as analysts for these broadcasts.

"Gone Fishin" is a segment aired whenever a team is knocked out of the playoffs (or a team failed to make the playoffs), and is usually accompanied by doctored photos of players on the team, and notable figures from the team's home city, on fishing boats with analyst Kenny Smith. It has its roots in the 1990s; when the Suns had a chance to eliminate a team, their gorilla mascot would hold a fishing pole to indicate the opponents would be "gone fishin'". The catchphrase has its own page on NBA.com and has also become a metaphor for being eliminated from the playoffs. MLB on TBS uses a similar phrase for when a team gets knocked out of the postseason, called "Gone Huntin", as most North American hunting seasons occur in mid-to-late fall. The NHL on TNT uses a similar phrase for when a team gets knocked out of the postseason, called "Gone Golfin'", as most North American's golfing occur in early-to-late summer.

Notable moments

Some segments of Inside have become famous and are sometimes referenced in callbacks on other episodes, or in other media.

Barkley's race with Dick Bavetta
While filling in for an injured Steve Kerr on a Los Angeles Lakers-Sacramento Kings broadcast, Charles Barkley made disparaging comments about the age of referee Dick Bavetta. The conversation between Barkley and play-by-play man Marv Albert eventually led him to comment that he could outrun Bavetta, and any other man of his age (Bavetta was 67 at the time).

This led Johnson and Smith to note that Bavetta, a physically fit referee whose job required him to run up and down the court on a nightly basis, would likely beat Barkley (who had become woefully out of shape compared to his playing career) in a race. Bavetta challenged Barkley to a footrace, which was then scheduled for the upcoming All-Star Weekend.

The race was heavily hyped on the Internet, receiving some mainstream attention as well. Several NBA players weighed in with predictions, and the overwhelming majority picked Bavetta to win the race.

Despite being the underdog, Barkley won the race by a comfortable margin. Both men ended up falling after the race; Bavetta dove for the finish line, and Barkley stumbled backwards and fell upon victory. With the race decided, the two exchanged a friendly hug and kiss. The race raised $50,000 for charity, and All-Star Saturday Night on TNT drew its highest number of television households in its twenty-two-year history.

Barkley's beef with Oakland
During the 2007 NBA Playoffs, following the Golden State Warriors' upset of the Dallas Mavericks, Barkley made some degrading comments about Oakland, California, saying things such as "it makes me mad, mad that they're in Golden State and not LA" and "it's not a city".  In response, the scoreboard at the Oracle Arena began showing a graphic of the Warriors' mascot throwing a pie at Barkley.

Oakland native and NBA legend Gary Payton, in his trademark competitive, trash-talking style, went around Oakland with a video camera to rebuke some of Barkley's comments and get some of the locals' opinions on Barkley and his comments, with Payton providing some of his own comments about "Sir Charles" and providing quips such as "It ain't no thrift store, it's Oakland".  The humorous segment, which also included embarrassing vintage coverage of Barkley being dunked on in a game against Golden State, aired during Inside the NBA'''s playoff coverage of the series between the Warriors and the Utah Jazz. The clip culminated with a shot of Payton standing in front of the San Francisco Bay saying "How do you feel about my city now, Chuck? ... Now, come see me, in person, here.  I've got a surprise for you, too, a lot of Krispy Kreme donuts."  The humorous controversy was subsequently put to rest.

 Smith's solidarity with the players' boycott in 2020 
In response to the shooting of Jacob Blake in Kenosha, Wisconsin, the Milwaukee Bucks boycotted Game 5 of their series against the Orlando Magic on August 26. Later that day, the NBA announced that in light of the Bucks' decision, all games for the day were postponed. In support for the players boycott, Kenny Smith walked out of the set while the show was aired live. “I think the biggest thing now — as a Black man and a former player — I think it’s best for me to not be here tonight,” Smith said.

ReceptionInside, since Barkley joined the show during the 2000–01 season, has become a particularly popular show due to its combination of league highlights with unscripted banter among the panelists. Bill Simmons of ESPN.com wrote in May 2002, when Johnson, Smith, and Barkley made up the core panel, that Inside was "the greatest TV studio show I've seen." Simmons observed, "A postgame show that occasionally improves on the ratings from the actual game? How rare is that?"

In 2014, the New York Times described Inside as "one of the most freewheeling, unpredictable and funny talk shows on television." The "On Comedy" columnist described O'Neal as the "weak link" but generally praised the interplay between the panelists in ways that often veer far from discussions of basketball games. In 2017, The Guardian wrote that the show's commentary had veered into hot takes, such as Barkley’s angry comments about LeBron James, and bullying, such as O'Neal's treatment of JaVale McGee on "Shaqtin' a Fool." The writer lamented that the show's analysis was becoming too close in style to that of morning sports talk shows like First Take and Undisputed.

Commentators have praised Inside the NBA for its panelists' willingness to have serious conversations when circumstances demand them. The panel's comments about the 2016 presidential election, particularly Johnson's, were praised in national media. Kenny Smith's solidarity with social justice protests in 2020 was described as "impactful" by a columnist for Sportscasting. "The outpouring of well wishes for Johnson and his family has shown that there may not be a more beloved person in sports media," wrote Jimmy Traina in Sports Illustrated in an article about the panel's public support for Johnson on Inside after his son Michael died. Johnson used his Twitter account and his appearance on Inside the following week to gratefully acknowledge the support he received from his coworkers and from the public.

Awards

As of the end of 2022, the show has won seventeen Sports Emmy Awards. Six times for the best daily show (2002, 2006, 2007, 2008, 2009, 2014), six times for the best weekly show (2012, 2014, 2019, 2020, 2021, 2022), three times for the best weekly show - limited run (2019, 2021, 2022), one for the best decoration and art visuals (2016) and one for the best social TV experience (2019). Johnson has also won six awards as a studio host (2002, 2007, 2015, 2019, 2020, 2021) and Barkley has won four as a studio analyst (2012, 2013, 2017, 2020).Inside was inducted into the Broadcasting & Cable Hall of Fame in October 2016, becoming the 12th program to receive the honor and the third sports show after SportsCenter and Monday Night Football.

Related showsOutside the NBA is a show on Facebook Watch that debuted on October 20, 2017. The same panel as on Inside talks about subjects outside of the NBA.

TNT aired The Inside Story, a four-part miniseries documenting Inside the NBA, during the NBA All-Star Break in March 2021. Each 90-minute (with commercials) episode focused on one core panelist. The miniseries was nominated for a Sports Emmy Award for Outstanding Documentary Series at the 43rd Sports Emmy Awards.The Steam Room is a video podcast hosted on YouTube starring Johnson and Barkley, named after a running joke from Inside. The podcast primarily consists of interviews and interactions with celebrities that are friends of Barkley and Johnson, sports media personalities, former NBA legends, comedians, and staff members.

Personalities

Current
Inside the NBA
Ernie Johnson – lead studio host
Kevin Frazier – fill-in host
Adam Lefkoe – fill-in host
Shaquille O'Neal – analyst and Shaqtin' a Fool Presenter (also appears on Tuesdays with the NBA on TNT Postgame Show'').
Kenny Smith – analyst
Charles Barkley –  analyst
Draymond Green – analyst

NBA on TNT Tuesday
Adam Lefkoe – Host
Shaquille O'Neal – Analyst
Candace Parker – Analyst
Jamal Crawford – Analyst

Former
Marc Fein – fill-in studio host
Magic Johnson – analyst
Jim Huber – contributor
Bob Lorenz – fill in host
Tracy McGrady - fill-in analyst
Kevin McHale – analyst
Gary Payton – analyst
Steve Kerr – analyst
Reggie Theus – analyst
Peter Vecsey – analyst
Cheryl Miller – interviewer
David Aldridge – contributor
Casey Stern – fill-in host
Dwyane Wade – analyst
Chris Webber – fill-in analyst

Theme music

The current theme song, composed by former guitarist of the progressive rock band Yes, Trevor Rabin has been used since the 2002-2003 season.

References

1989 American television series debuts
2001 American television series debuts
1980s American television series
1990s American television series
2000s American television series
2010s American television series
2020s American television series
American sports television series
National Basketball Association on television
TNT (American TV network) original programming
Turner Sports